Thicket Portage Airport  is located  west southwest of Thicket Portage, Manitoba, Canada.

References

External links

Certified airports in Manitoba